Ishwarchak is a village situated in the Nalanda district of Bihar State in India.

Villages in Nalanda district